Tamgha-i-Khidmat or Tamgha-e-Khidmat (literally "medal of services") is a Civilian and military award of the Islamic Republic of Pakistan. In Pakistan Army, it is applicable to junior commissioned officers, in addition to the Frontier Corps and the Frontier Constabulary. It is given to those Frontier Constabulary service personnel who are serving or has served under the federal government. This award is also given to chief petty officers of the navy, flight sergeants of the air force and non-commissioned officers with the equivalent ranks of the eligible forces such as land-based army, air force and navy.

Also given below the rank of junior commissioned officers, Tamgha-i-Khidmat is usually awarded for rendering "long meritorious or distinguished service of a non-operational nature".

Class

See also
 Pakistani Armed Forces
Awards and decorations of the Pakistan military

References

External links
 Decorations and Medals of Pakistan

Military awards and decorations of Pakistan
Civil awards and decorations of Pakistan